The 2019 Shanghai Rolex Masters was a tennis tournament played on outdoor hard courts. It was the 11th edition of the Shanghai ATP Masters 1000, classified as an ATP Tour Masters 1000 event on the 2019 ATP Tour. It took place at Qizhong Forest Sports City Arena in Shanghai, China from October 6 to 13, 2019. This was also the last edition of the Shanghai Masters held to date as not being held in 2020, 2021 and 2022 due to the COVID-19 pandemic in China.

Singles main-draw entrants

Seeds
The following were the seeded players. Seedings were based on ATP rankings as of September 30, 2019. Rankings and points before are as of October 7, 2019.

† The player used an exemption to skip the tournament in 2018. Accordingly, points for his 18th best result are deducted instead.

The following players would have been seeded, but they withdrew from the event.

Other entrants
The following players received wildcards into the singles main draw:
 Li Zhe
 Andy Murray
 Zhang Ze
 Zhang Zhizhen

The following player received entry as a special exempt:
  John Millman

The following players received entry from the qualifying draw:
 Alexander Bublik
 Pablo Carreño Busta
 Marco Cecchinato
 Jérémy Chardy
 Juan Ignacio Londero
 Cameron Norrie
 Vasek Pospisil

Withdrawals
Before the tournament
 Kevin Anderson → replaced by  Frances Tiafoe
 Juan Martín del Potro → replaced by  Lorenzo Sonego
 Laslo Đere → replaced by  Filip Krajinović
 Nick Kyrgios → replaced by  Albert Ramos Viñolas
 Rafael Nadal → replaced by  Pablo Cuevas
 Kei Nishikori → replaced by  Sam Querrey
 Milos Raonic → replaced by  Mikhail Kukushkin
 Stan Wawrinka → replaced by  Miomir Kecmanović

Retirements
 Mikhail Kukushkin

Doubles main-draw entrants

Seeds

 Rankings are as of September 30, 2019

Other entrants
The following pairs received wildcards into the doubles main draw:
 Borna Ćorić /  Hua Runhao
 Gao Xin /  Li Zhe
 Gong Maoxin /  Zhang Ze

Champions

Singles

  Daniil Medvedev def.  Alexander Zverev, 6–4, 6–1

Doubles

 Mate Pavić /  Bruno Soares def.  Łukasz Kubot /  Marcelo Melo, 6–4, 6–2

References

External links
Official Website

 
Shanghai ATP Masters 1000
Shanghai Masters (tennis)
Rolex Shanghai Masters
Shanghai Masters